Kheyrabad (also Romanized as Kheyrābād and Khairabād) is a village in Qushkhaneh-ye Bala Rural District, Qushkhaneh District, Shirvan County, North Khorasan Province, Iran. At the 2006 census, its population was 564, in 132 families.

The local language is North khorasan Turkish.

References 

Populated places in Shirvan County